The National Center for Public Policy and Higher Education is an independent, nonprofit, nonpartisan organization about higher education in the United States.

Overview
It was established in 1998. It receives funding from The Pew Charitable Trusts. It is headquartered in San Jose, California. Its board of directors is chaired by former North Carolina Governor Jim Hunt. Virginia B. Smith is a founding director.

References

Organizations established in 1998
Educational foundations in the United States